A leadership election for the Civic Democratic Party was held on 7 November 1992 during the party's Congress in Prague. It was held prior to expected dissolution of Czechoslovakia and following to 1992 legislative election in which the Civic Democratic Party was victorious. The incumbent leader Václav Klaus was reelected as party's leader. Klaus was unopposed and received votes of 333 delegates while only 8 delegates voted against him.

References

1992
1992 elections in Czechoslovakia
Single-candidate elections
Elections in Prague
Civic Democratic Party leadership election